Katherine A. Nossel Klausmeier (born February 22, 1950) is a Democratic politician from Maryland. She is currently serving in the Maryland State Senate and is a member of the Senate Finance Committee.  She was first elected as a Delegate in 1994, and as a State Senator in 2002.  Senator Klausmeier represents the 8th Legislative District which includes part of Baltimore County.

Education
Klausmeier was born in Baltimore, Maryland, and attended The Catholic High School of Baltimore.  She has an associate degree from the Community College of Baltimore County (formerly Essex Community College) and developed the Child Life Department at St. Joseph Hospital in Baltimore County.  She was President of the Gunpowder Elementary School PTA (1987–89, 1991–94) and has an Honorary Life Membership to the Maryland Parent Teacher Association.

Legislative career
Senator Klausmeier is currently the chair of the Senate Rules Committee and has been a member of the Senate Finance Committee since 2003, the Senate Executive Nominations Committee since 2007, the Joint Committee on Protocol since 2007, and the Joint Committee on Ethics since 2017. Following the 2022 elections, Klausmeier is the longest serving current member of the Maryland Senate.

Klausmeier's main legislative issue areas include combating the Opioid Crisis in Maryland, addressing the rising costs of prescription drugs, preserving and expanding aquaculture in the Chesapeake Bay, workers' compensation, investment in trade and apprenticeship programs, and expanding renewable energy production and infrastructure across the State of Maryland. 
 
In 2017, Klausmeier sponsored and was instrumental in the enactment of the H.O.P.E. Act, which addresses the Opioid Crisis in Maryland and increases access to behavioral healthcare services.

Personal life
Klausmeier is married and has two daughters and four grandchildren.

Election results
1998 Race for Maryland House of Delegates – District 08
Voters to choose three:
{| class="wikitable"
|-
!Name
!Votes
!Percent
!Outcome
|-
|-
|Katherine Klausmeier, Dem.
|19,835
|  21%
|   Won
|-
|-
|Alfred W. Redmer Jr., Rep
|17,846
|  19%
|   Won
|-
|-
|James F. Ports, Jr., Rep.
|17,756
|  19%
|   Won
|-
|-
|J. Joseph Curran III, Dem.
|17,583
|  19%
|   Lost
|-
|-
|Joseph C. Boteler III, Rep.
|11,306
|  12%
|   Lost
|-
|-
|Taras Andrew Vizzi, Dem.
|9,927
|  11%
|   Lost
|-
|}

1994 Race for Maryland House of Delegates – District 08
Voters to choose three:
{| class="wikitable"
|-
!Name
!Votes
!Percent
!Outcome
|-
|-
|Katherine Klausmeier, Dem.
|17,496
|  20%
|   Won
|-
|-
|Alfred W. Redmer Jr., Rep.
|14,876
|  18%
|   Won
|-
|-
|James F. Ports Jr., Rep.
|15,244
|  17%
|   Won
|-
|-
|Calvin Clemons, Rep.
|13,996
|  16%
|   Lost
|-
|-
|Daniel E. McKew, Dem.
|12,931
|  15%
|   Lost
|-
|-
|John G. Disney, Dem.
|11,886
|  14%
|   Lost
|-
|}

External links
Senator Klausmeier's Maryland Manual On-Line Page
Senator Klausmeier's Official Website

References

1935 births
21st-century American politicians
21st-century American women politicians
Living people
Democratic Party Maryland state senators
Democratic Party members of the Maryland House of Delegates
Women state legislators in Maryland